The marquessate of La Garde de Chambonas was a French noble family whose origins are located in Auvergne and Gévaudan. The family La Garde is first quoted as a lordship in 1152 and created marquessate in 1683.

The ascertained filiation started in the 14th century. The last marquess died in 1927 and his only son was killed at war in 1918. The name is still worn by the descendants.

Main personalities 

Victor Scipion Charles Auguste de La Garde de Chambonas (1750 in Chambonas-1830 in Paris), a general who embraced the ideas of the French Revolution, first constitutional mayor of Sens, and one of the last foreign minister of Louis XVI (June-July 1792).

Guy Azaïs de La Garde de Chambonas (1942), navy officer, diplomat, deputy chief of the French secret services (1993-1997), ambassador of France to Benin (1989-1992), Columbia (1997-2000), and Angola (2004-2007).

Posterity 

According to the traditional principles of nobility in France the title and the noble character of the family definitely end up in 1927. However, the French law to lost surnames due to war causes (1923) allowed the grandsons of the war hero to raise the surname. Hence two branches of the family:
 Rollin de La Garde de Chambonas
 Azaïs de La Garde de Chambonas

Heraldry  

Azure, a chief Argent

Its motto is "Deus, Rex, Amici" ("the Lord, the King, our Friends").

References 

French noble families